The Constitution Party National Convention is held by the United States Constitution Party every two to four years. , there have been eight.

National conventions

1992 convention
The first national convention of the party, then known as the U.S. Taxpayers Party, was held in September 1992 in New Orleans, Louisiana.

1996 convention
The second national convention of the U.S. Taxpayers Party was held on August 15 and 16, 1996, at the Hotel Del Coronado in San Diego, California.

1999 convention
The 1999 convention was held September 1–6, 1999, at the Regal Riverfront Hotel in St. Louis, Missouri. It was here that the party changed its name from the U.S. Taxpayers Party to the Constitution Party.

Joseph Sobran was nominated unanimously for vice president.

Joseph Sobran later withdrew in April 2000, citing scheduling conflicts with his journalistic commitments. Curtis Frazier, a surgeon from Missouri, was later selected by the Party Committee to be his replacement on the ticket.

2004 convention
In 2004 the convention was held at Valley Forge, Pennsylvania, from June 23 to June 26.

Michael Peroutka and Chuck Baldwin were nominated unanimously for president and vice president, respectively.

2008 convention
The 2008 convention was held on April 24–27, 2008, in Kansas City, Missouri.

2012 convention

The 2012 Presidential Nominating Convention was held in Nashville, Tennessee, on April 18–21.

Jim Clymer was nominated for vice president by voice vote.

2016 convention
The 2016 Presidential Nominating Convention was held in Salt Lake City, Utah, on April 13–16.

Scott Bradley was nominated for vice president by voice vote.

2020 convention
The 2020 Presidential Nominating Convention was held via videoconference from May 1 to May 2.

William Mohr was nominated for vice president unanimously.

References

Constitution Party (United States)
United States presidential nominating conventions by political party